Harcharan Dass Chawla (November 4, 1926 – November 5, 2001) was an Urdu writer.

Born in Mianwali (now Pakistan), he moved to Delhi, India as a refugee as a result of the 1947 partition of India. The event served as the backdrop for his first novel Darinday, and would leave a lasting impression throughout his career, with migration and cultural identity dominant themes of his work.

After graduating from the Panjab University in Chandigarh in 1956 and working for Indian Railways, in 1971 Chawla moved to Frankfurt, Germany then Oslo, Norway in 1974 where he would eventually settle. His shift to Europe would bring new dimension to his writing, addressing issues of loss of culture and identity faced by South Asians migrating to different parts of the world.

In Oslo, Chawla helped creating a literary bridge between the Indian subcontinent and Norway by translating Norwegian stories into Urdu and Hindi and South Asian work into Norwegian. Completing the work of his wife Purnima Chawla who died in the midst of the process, he translated Knut Hamsun's novel Victoria. En kjærlighedshistorie into Hindi and Urdu and Indian Foreteller, a compilation of stories by Indian writers into Norwegian. He was also the Urdu, Hindi and Punjabi consultant for Deichmanske Bibliotek, Oslo.

Works

Darinday, 1968 (Urdu)
Aks Aiyene Ke, 1974 (Urdu, short stories)
The Broken Horizon, 1974 (English, short stories)
Ret, Samundar aur Jhag, 1980 (Urdu, short stories)
Chiragh Ke Zakhm, 1980 (Urdu)
Akhri Kadam se Pehle, 1983 (Hindi, short stories) 
Aate Jaate Mausmon Ka Sach Afsaney, 1984 (Urdu)
Pani di Aurat, 1985 (Punjabi)
Norway Ke Behtreen Afsaney, 1989 (Urdu, short stories, translated)
Anguish of a Horse and other stories, 1990 (English, short stories)
Dil, Dimagh aur Duniya, 1992 (Urdu, short stories)
India Foreteller, 1992 (Norwegian, translated)
Sach Jaise Sapne, 1992 (Urdu, short stories)
Tumko Dekha, 1992 (Urdu, short stories)
Bhatke Hue Log, 1993 (Urdu, Hindi)
Dhoop Ek Chadar, 1993 (Hindi, Urdu, novel)
Darya aur Kinaare, 1995 (Urdu, short stories)
Dhai Akkhar, 1996 (Urdu)
Garebaan Jhut Bolta Hai: Afsaney aur Afsance, 1996 (Urdu)
Victoria, 1996 (Urdu, Hindi, translated, with Purnima Chawla)
Album Yadon Ki, 2001 (Urdu, Hindi)
Yaadein, 2001 (Hindi)
Bhatke Hue Log, 1984, 2003 (Hindi)
Fan or Shakhsiyat, 2003 (Urdu)
Adrift, 2003 (English)

Short Story Contributions

Back to Ganges, in Roses in Snow - Poems and Lyrics of Immigrants in Norway, Sweden and Denmark edited by Khalid Salimi, 1988
Between the Lines, in Contemporary Urdu Short Stories: An Anthology, selected and translated by Jai Ratan, 1991

Honours and awards 
 Rajinder Singh Bedi Award
 Uttar Pradesh Urdu Academy Award - 1976, 1981, 1991
 Zalaten Klas Bulgaria International Short Story Competition
 All India Meer Academy Award - 1981

See also

List of Urdu language writers

External links

 General
 An article about the Chawlas. Count the blessings of old age, Khushwant Singh, Tribune India

Urdu-language novelists
1926 births
2001 deaths
Punjabi people